Woldzigt (Drèents for 'view of the woods') is a smock mill in Roderwolde, Drenthe, the Netherlands. The mill has two functions; a grain mill and an oil mill. It was built in 1852 and is listed as a Rijksmonument, number 32541.

History
Woldzigt was built in 1852 for S J Datema and E F Aukema. It was built as a grain mill and oil mill combined. The oil mill was used to crush linseed to produce linseed oil and rapeseed to produce rapeseed oil. The season for oil milling ran from September until May. Throughout the year the mill also functioned as a grain mill.

In 1902, the mill was sold to Jan Rietema of Leens. A Deutz petrol engine was installed in that year as auxiliary power. In 1906, the petrol engine was replaced by a steam engine. Rietema worked the mill until 1919 when he left to take the oil mill Tjamsweer at Appingedam, Groningen. The steam engine was removed at that date. The mill was then sold to the coöperatieve olieslagerij en korenmalerij Woldzigt G.A. It was worked by Jan Faber who had been employed at the mill since 1912. During this time the mill was used to produce cattle food and artificial fertiliser. In 1941, the mill ceased to produce oil. The mill was sold to the Coöperatieve Zuivelfabriek Roden-Zevenhuizen in 1945. Jan Faber died in 1946. The mill was then worked by Frederick van der Velde, who had been employed at the mill since 1925. The mill was producing  of wheatflour per day. Grain milling ended in 1951.

In 1970, the mill was sold to the Gemeente Roden. The Stichting olie- en korenmolen Woldzigt (English: Oil and grain mill Woldzigt Society) was formed. The mill was completely restored in 1976.

Description

Woldzigt is what the Dutch describe as an "achtkante stellingmolen". It is a three-storey smock mill on a four-storey brick base. The smock and cap are thatched. The mill is winded by a tailpole and winch. The windshaft also carries the brake wheel, which has 72 cogs. The brake wheel drives the wallower (48 cogs) at the top of the upright shaft. At the bottom of the upright shaft the great spur wheel, which has 103 cogs, drives the  diameter  French Burr millstones via a lantern pinion stone nut which has 24 staves. The  diameter edge runner stones and the stamp mills are driven by lantern pinion stone nuts of 26 and 27 staves.

Millers

S J Datema 1852-1902
E F Aukema 1852-1902
Jan Rietema 1902-19
Jan Faber 1912-46
Frederick van der Velde 1925-51

Public access

Woldzigt is open all year round on the first Saturday in the month from 13:30 to 17:00. From May to September, the mill is open Wednesdays to Saturdays from 13:30 to 17:00.

References

External links

Woldzigt website

Windmills in Drenthe
Smock mills in the Netherlands
Windmills completed in 1852
Rijksmonuments in Drenthe
Octagonal buildings in the Netherlands
Noordenveld
1852 establishments in the Netherlands
19th-century architecture in the Netherlands